The 2016 Lao League is the 27th season of the Lao League, the top Laotian professional league for association football clubs, since its establishment in 1990. The season began on 26 March 2016, and is scheduled to conclude in late 2016.

Lao Toyota came into the season as defending champions of the 2015 season. Lao Army, National University of Laos, VSV United and Saythany City were promoted from the lower leagues.

Teams 
A total of 14 teams will participate in the 2016 Lao League season, ten from the previous season and four promoted teams. No teams were relegated after the 2015 season due to league expansion as Lao Army, National University of Laos, Saythany City and VSV United were promoted from the lower leagues. Hoang Anh Attapeu, who finished 5th in 2015, withdrew from the league while SHB Vientiane were renamed as CSC Champa and Savan were renamed as Savan United.

Stadia
Note: Table lists in alphabetical order.

League table

Results

Matchday 1

Matchday 2

Matchday 3

Matchday 4

Matchday 5

Matchday 6

Matchday 7

Matchday 8

Matchday 9

Note: Remaining four matches from Matchday 9 were postponed due to international call-ups, namely with Laos for their friendly match against Nepal and then their 2019 AFC Asian Cup qualifiers versus India. New dates not yet announced.

Matchday 10

Note: Remaining four matches from Matchday 10 were postponed due to international call-ups, namely with Laos for their 2019 AFC Asian Cup qualifiers versus India. New dates not yet announced.

Matchday 11

References

External links 
Soccerway
RSSSF
Lao Football Federation website 

Laos
Laos
Lao Premier League seasons